Cache Craze is a Canadian treasure hunt themed television show featuring challenges that are typical for a game show such as: Hiking, Swimming, etc. This reality competition features undertakings such as teams tracking down caches with the help of GPS technology, exploring mazes and enduring a series of other mental and physical challenges as they race to collect points from nabbing hidden geocaches. The last team standing will go home with cash and prizes and "The Amazing Amaze Ball!". The show is hosted by Ryan Horwood.

References

External links
 

2013 Canadian television series debuts
2014 Canadian television series endings
Canadian children's game shows
2010s Canadian game shows
YTV (Canadian TV channel) original programming
Television series by 9 Story Media Group
Television series by Corus Entertainment
2010s Canadian children's television series